The Ivanovsky (Ивановский) is a 10-metre high waterfall in the Sochi National Park, Russia. It is part of the Psakho River. Just below the waterfall is a small cool lake. In summertime, the waterfall is frequented by tourists.

Other Sochi waterfalls 
 Orekhovsky
 Polikarya

References 

Waterfalls of Russia
Sochi
Landforms of Krasnodar Krai